Lasiochlamys pseudocoriacea is a species of flowering plant in the family Salicaceae. It is endemic to New Caledonia.

References

Endemic flora of New Caledonia
pseudocoriacea
Vulnerable plants
Taxonomy articles created by Polbot